The Cappatilize Project is the fourth studio album by American rapper and Wu-Tang Clan member Cappadonna. The album was released on July 22, 2008

Track listing 
 "Cap's Back Again"
 "The Anointing"
 "Don't Turn Around" (featuring Q-Dini)
 "Peace God" (featuring Born Divine)
 "Get Paper" (featuring Lounge Lo)
 "If You Don't Stop" (featuring Born Divine)
 "One Night Love Affair"
 "Growth and Development" (featuring Hue Hefna & Lahluga)
 "Dream"
 "Gotta Find A Way" (featuring Born Divine & MPM)
 "Wanted" (featuring KMC)
 "Goon Skwad"
 "Tug Dat Rope"
 "My Gang" (featuring Born Divine & The Better Lifers)
 "Holdin'" (featuring Lounge Lo)

2008 albums
Cappadonna albums